Colonial architecture in Surabaya (Dutch: Soerabaja) includes the legacy of neoclassical architecture and Dutch architecture built during the Dutch East Indies era. The old city in Surabaya is a tourist attraction but faces problems with the deterioration of older buildings. It includes Dutch architecture, has an Arab quarter and areas exhibiting Chinese influence. Jembatan Merah is an area known for its Dutch architecture.

Cosman Citroen designed a city hall in 1916 and planned the area of Ketabang. Museum Bank Indonesia, Surabaya is located in the former Bank of Java branch building. The House of Sampoerna i s a museum devoted to the history of clove cigarette (kretek) manufacturing in Indonesia and is housed in a Dutch colonial building (originally an orphanage) dating to 1864.

Gallery

See also
Colonial architecture of Indonesia
Colonial architecture of Jakarta

References

Further reading
The heritage and impact of Dutch architecture and civil engineering in Surabaya and Malang Petra University Surabaya 2003

Surabaya
Surabaya